Qeshlaq-e Quzlu (also Romanized as Qeshlāq-e Qūzlū; also known as Qūrī Daraq) is a village in Azadlu Rural District, Muran District, Germi County, Ardabil Province, Iran. At the 2006 census, its population was 112, in 17 families.

References 

Towns and villages in Germi County